Quri Chay-ye Gharbi Rural District is in Saraju District of Maragheh County, East Azerbaijan province, Iran. At the National Census of 2006, its population was 4,382 in 878 households. There were 4,023 inhabitants in 1,082 households at the following census of 2011. At the most recent census of 2016, the population of the rural district was 3,641 in 1,092 households. The largest of its 54 villages was Dash Bolagh Bazar, with 238 people.

References 

Maragheh County

Rural Districts of East Azerbaijan Province

Populated places in East Azerbaijan Province

Populated places in Maragheh County